Brian Norton Baird (born March 7, 1956) is an American psychologist and politician.

After leaving the U.S. House of Representatives, he served as the president of Antioch University Seattle from 2011 to 2015.

Early life and education
Baird was born in Chama, New Mexico, to Edith S. and William N. ("Bill") Baird, a town councilman and mayor. He received his Bachelor of Science degree from the University of Utah, graduating Phi Beta Kappa in 1977, and his Master of Science degree and PhD in clinical psychology from the University of Wyoming.

Career
He is the former chairman of the Department of Psychology at Pacific Lutheran University in Tacoma, Washington, and a licensed clinical psychologist. He has published several journal articles and three books. He regularly teaches professional development courses to attorneys and judges on communications, ethics and the psychology of persuasion. Baird is a member of the ReFormers Caucus of Issue One.

U.S. House of Representatives

Committee assignments
Committee on Science and Technology
Subcommittee on Energy and Environment (Chairman)
Subcommittee on Research and Science Education
Committee on Transportation and Infrastructure
Subcommittee on Coast Guard and Maritime Transportation
Subcommittee on Highways and Transit
Subcommittee on Water Resources and Environment

Caucus memberships
Congressional Career and Technical Education Caucus (co-founder)
Congressional Caucus to Control and Fight Methamphetamine (co-founder)
Congressional National Parks Caucus (co-founder)
Addiction, Treatment, and Recovery Caucus
Community College Caucus
Community Health Centers Caucus
Congressional Boating Caucus
Congressional Brain Injury Task Force
Congressional Caucus on Intellectual Property Promotion and Piracy Prevention
Congressional China Caucus
Congressional Coast Guard Caucus
Congressional Coastal Caucus
Congressional Diabetes Caucus
Congressional Fire Service Caucus
Congressional Fitness Caucus
Congressional Mental Health Caucus
Congressional Native American Caucus
Congressional Port Security Caucus
Congressional Rural Caucus
Congressional Ski and Snowboard Caucus
Democratic Caucus
Friends of New Zealand Caucus
Hellenic Caucus
House Education Caucus
House Science, Technology, Engineering and Math Education Caucus
International Conservation Caucus
Medical Malpractice Caucus
New Democrat Caucus
Northwest Energy Caucus
Prochoice Caucus Democratic Task Force
Renewable Energy and Energy Efficiency Caucus
U.S. China Working Group
Congressional Law Enforcement Caucus
Mountain West Caucus
Middle East Economic Partnership Caucus

Baird was also a member of the House Transportation and Infrastructure Committee, the House Science Committee, the House Budget Committee, and the House Select Committee on Continuity in Government. He served as a senior regional whip and on the Democratic Steering Committee, was elected president of the 1998 Democratic Freshman Class, and was a member of the New Democrat Coalition.

On his House of Representatives website, Baird wrote that during his time in Congress, he had flown home nearly every weekend and hosted more than 280 town hall meetings, and that he had visited every high school, port, hospital and countless businesses and organizations in Southwest Washington.

Baird held over 300 town halls, or one for approximately every week and a half he was in office.  Although they usually had around 50 participants, when held during passionate debates, they had up to 3000.

Visit to Gaza Strip
On February 19, 2009, Baird, together with fellow congressman Keith Ellison (D-MN), visited Gaza to view firsthand the destruction from the Gaza War and meet with international and local relief agencies. Others in the visit included Senator John Kerry (D-MA). The visit, which was not sanctioned by the Obama Administration, was the first time anyone from the U.S. government had entered Gaza in more than three years. Baird said:

After Baird's third visit to Gaza in February 2010, he called on the U.S. to end the blockade and to deliver humanitarian supplies, which could include withholding military aid from Israel, saying the U.S. needed to be more serious about getting Israel to address the humanitarian crisis in Gaza.

Political campaigns
Baird challenged Republican incumbent Linda Smith in 1996 and lost by only 887 votes. Smith gave up the seat to make an unsuccessful bid for the United States Senate in 1998. Baird ran again and defeated State Senator Don Benton with 54.7% of the vote. He never faced another race that close, and was reelected five times.

On December 9, 2009, Baird announced he would not run for reelection in 2010. After his retirement, Baird and his family moved to Edmonds, Washington, and he wrote books on American politics.

Electoral history

Books

Personal life
Baird is married to Rachel Nugent and they have two children together. He is the maternal uncle of singer-songwriters Billie Eilish and Finneas O'Connell.

References

External links
 Brian Baird Our Congressman! Archived October 30, 2008, version of official campaign website, 5 days before Election Day for Baird's final campaign 
 

1956 births
Living people
Pacific Lutheran University faculty
People from Rio Arriba County, New Mexico
University of Utah alumni
University of Wyoming alumni
People from Edmonds, Washington
Democratic Party members of the United States House of Representatives from Washington (state)
20th-century American politicians
21st-century American politicians